Golbaengi-muchim or moon snail salad is a type of muchim (salad) made by mixing moon snails with vegetables. In South Korea, it is an anju (food served and eaten with alcoholic drinks) typically made with red, spicy sauce and served with boiled somyeon (wheat noodles). Like other anju, it is sold in pojangmacha (street stalls).

Preparation 
Moon snails are washed, boiled, and shelled. Bigger ones are halved, and the snail meat is mixed with vegetables (most commonly julienned scallions, carrots, onions, and sliced cucumber), soaked and shredded hwangtae-po (yellow dried pollock), and seasonings (most commonly chili paste, chili powder, soy sauce, minced garlic, vinegar, and sesame oil). It is served with toasted sesame seeds sprinkled on top. Often, boiled somyeon (wheat noodles) to be mixed with the spicy salad is served together.

Gallery

See also 

 Bún ốc
 Escargot
 List of salads
 Luósīfěn

References 

Salads
Seafood dishes
Snail dishes